The 1999 Halton Borough Council election took place on 6 May 1999 to elect members of Halton Unitary Council in Cheshire, England. One third of the council was up for election and the Labour Party stayed in overall control of the council. Overall turnout in the election was 22.2%.

After the election, the composition of the council was:
Labour 46
Liberal Democrat 8
Conservative 1
Vacant 1

Results

References

1999 English local elections
1999
1990s in Cheshire